Duilio Carrillo (born 24 March 1997) is a Mexican modern pentathlete. He competed in the men's event at the 2020 Summer Olympics.

References

External links
 

1997 births
Living people
Mexican male modern pentathletes
Modern pentathletes at the 2020 Summer Olympics
Olympic modern pentathletes of Mexico
Sportspeople from Guadalajara, Jalisco
Pan American Games medalists in modern pentathlon
Pan American Games gold medalists for Mexico
Modern pentathletes at the 2019 Pan American Games
Medalists at the 2019 Pan American Games
20th-century Mexican people
21st-century Mexican people